The WABA Champions Cup 1998 was the 1st staging of the WABA Champions Cup, the basketball club tournament of West Asia Basketball Association. The tournament was held in Amman, Jordan between February 23 and February 27. The winner qualify for the ABC Champions Cup 1998.

Standings

References
WABA Champions Cup - Roll of Honor 
 www.hamshahrionline.ir

1998
International basketball competitions hosted by Jordan
1998–99 in Asian basketball
1997–98 in Iranian basketball
1997–98 in Lebanese basketball
1997–98 in Jordanian basketball
1998 in Syrian sport
1998 in Yemen